Anna  Luca Biani (born 1 April 1991 as Ana Giorgobiani, also known by their stage name Anna Gurji, is an American filmmaker and actor. They first appeared in film as a child, in a short documentary named "Town" (1998). They made their dramatic debut in the short drama-film "If This Day Never Happened" (2006). Biani then gained the lead role as an 18th-century violinist named Cinka Panna, in Slovak-Hungarian feature film "Cinka Panna", directed by Dusan Rapos.

Biography and Career
Anna “Luca” Biani is a genderfluid actor from Tbilisi, Georgia, based in Los Angeles, CA, and goes by they/them pronouns. Luca began their acting career at the age of 6, appearing in a number of commercials, as well as a documentary. At the age of 14 Luca landed their first big role as a lead actor in the 2006 short film called "If This Day Never Happened", directed by their sister Khatuna Giorgobiani.
 
Two years later, Luca was cast as the leading role in the historical feature film "Cinka Panna", where they played the famous 18th century Hungarian gypsy violinist. The film went on to win a Golden Palm Award at the 2009 Mexico International Film Festival.
 
Since then, Luca has acted in theater plays, improv comedy performances, and a series of films including Freaky Deaky (alongside Christian Slater), "Windsor Drive" (costarring Samaire Armstrong), and "Sacred Blood" (with Bai Ling and Michael Madsen).
 
In 2017, Luca has extended their talents, adding directing to their ever-growing repertoire.
 
Their directorial debut "G-4" is a short film that presents incredible special effects make up, as well as dance performances choreographed by famed choreographer Brian Friedman (So You Think You Can Dance, producer/creative director of America's Got Talent, and The X Factor). The film got selected at the festival Dances With Films, and is picked up for a worldwide distribution by shorts.tv.
 
In addition to acting and directing, Luca also enjoys playing drums and bass guitar, as well as writing poetry and prose. In 2008 they received an award for scholastic achievement, bestowed upon them by none other than the president of Georgia, Mikheil Saakashvili.

Filmography
 G4
 Sacred Blood (2015)
 Windsor Drive (2015)
 Kessler’s Lab
 Freaky Deaky (2012)
 Loverly (2011)
 Christmas Eve. (2010)
 Memorias del desarrollo (2010)
 Sendpoint (2009)
 Cinka Panna (2008)
 If This Day Never Happened (2006)
 Town (1998)

References

1991 births
Living people
Actors from Tbilisi
Georgian emigrants to the United States
Genderfluid people